Bishop of Newcastle may refer to:

 Bishop of Newcastle (England)
 Anglican Bishop of Newcastle (Australia)
 Bishop of the Roman Catholic Diocese of Maitland-Newcastle, Australia